José Acasuso and Sebastián Prieto were defending champions, but Acasuso chose not to compete. Prieto teamed up with Martín García and lost in the quarterfinals.

Gastón Gaudio and Max Mirnyi won the title, defeating  Yves Allegro and Robert Lindstedt

Seeds

Draw

Draw

References

External links
 Main Draw

MercedesCup - Doubles
Doubles 2006
2006 in German tennis